is a Japanese footballer currently playing as a midfielder for Nakhon Mae Sot United in the Thai League 3.

Career statistics

Club
.

Notes

References

External links
Players Profile - Thai League

1997 births
Living people
Senshu University alumni
Japanese footballers
Association football midfielders
J3 League players
Fujieda MYFC players
Thai League 3 players